Hayato Komori (小森隼 Komori Hayato, born 13 June 1995) is a Japanese dancer and actor. He is one of the performers of the Japanese all-male dance and music group Generations from Exile Tribe.

Hayato is represented with LDH.

Career 
Hayato Komori was born on June 13, 1995, in Mie Prefecture, Japan. He is half Korean.

Hayato entered Tokyo's EXPG when he was in elementary school.

In April 2011, he was selected as a candidate of Generations through an audition held in EXPG and in April 2012 he became an official member.

In March 2014, he graduated from Hinode High school, which Alan Shirahama of the same group was his senior in. In the same month, he participated in Exile Performer Battle Audition and made it to the finals but wasn’t selected to join EXILE.

In October 2019, he made his acting debut with the movie "High & Low The Worst".

Hayato is an all-round dancer and the first Japanese member to join the dance crew of Chicago Footwork.

Filmography

Movies

TV dramas

TV shows

Internet programs

Radio

Advertisements

Music videos

Live

Series

References

External links 

 Official Website(in English)
 Official Twitter (@hayato_official)

1995 births
Living people
21st-century dancers
Japanese male dancers
LDH (company) artists
People from Mie Prefecture